The Pterygota are a subclass of insects that includes all winged insects and the orders that are secondarily wingless (that is, insect groups whose ancestors once had wings but that have lost them as a result of subsequent evolution).

The pterygotan group comprises 99.9% of all insects. The orders not included are the Archaeognatha (jumping bristletails) and the Zygentoma (silverfishes and firebrats), two primitively wingless insect orders. Also not included is Entognatha, which consist of three orders no longer considered to be insects: Protura, Collembola, and Diplura.

Unlike Archaeognatha and Zygentoma, the pterygotes don't have styli or vesicles on their abdomen (also absent in some zygentomans), and with the exception of the majority of mayflies, are also missing the median terminal filament which is present in the ancestrally wingless insects.

Systematics
Traditionally, this group was divided into the infraclasses Paleoptera and Neoptera. The former are nowadays strongly suspected of being paraphyletic, and better treatments (such as dividing or dissolving the group) are presently being discussed. In addition, it is not clear how exactly the neopterans are related among each other. The Exopterygota might be a similar assemblage of rather ancient hemimetabolous insects among the Neoptera like the Palaeoptera are among insects as a whole. The holometabolous Endopterygota seem to be very close relatives, indeed, but nonetheless appear to contain several clades of related orders, the status of which is not agreed upon.

The following scheme uses finer divisions than the one above, which is not well-suited to correctly accommodating the fossil groups.

Infraclass Palaeoptera
(probably paraphyletic)
 Ephemeroptera (mayflies)
 Palaeodictyoptera †(extinct)
 Megasecoptera †(extinct)
 Archodonata †(extinct)
 Diaphanopterodea †(extinct)
 Protodonata or Meganisoptera †(extinct; sometimes included in Odonata)
 Protanisoptera †(extinct; sometimes included in Odonata)
 Triadophlebioptera †(extinct; sometimes included in Odonata)
 Protozygoptera or Archizygoptera †(extinct; sometimes included in Odonata)
 Odonata (dragonflies and damselflies)

Infraclass Neoptera
Superorder Exopterygota
 Caloneurodea †(extinct)
 Titanoptera †(extinct)
 Protorthoptera †(extinct)
 Plecoptera (stoneflies)
 Embioptera (webspinners)
 Zoraptera (angel insects)
 Dermaptera (earwigs)
 Orthoptera (grasshoppers, etc.)
 Phasmatodea (stick insects – tentatively placed here)
 Notoptera (gladiators and ice-crawlers – tentatively placed here)
Proposed superorder Dictyoptera
 Blattodea (cockroaches and termites)
 Mantodea (mantids)
 Alienoptera  †(extinct)
Proposed superorder Paraneoptera
 Psocoptera (booklice, barklice)
 Thysanoptera (thrips)
 Phthiraptera (lice)
 Hemiptera (true bugs)

Superorder Endopterygota
 Hymenoptera (ants, bees, etc.)
 Coleoptera (beetles)
 Strepsiptera (twisted-winged parasites)
 Raphidioptera (snakeflies)
 Megaloptera (alderflies, etc.)
 Neuroptera (net-veined insects)
Proposed superorder Mecopteroidea/Antliophora
 Mecoptera (scorpionflies, etc.)
 Siphonaptera (fleas)
 Diptera (true flies)
 Protodiptera †(extinct)
Proposed superorder Amphiesmenoptera
 Trichoptera (caddisflies)
 Lepidoptera (butterflies, moths)

Neoptera orders incertae sedis
 Glosselytrodea †(extinct)
 Miomoptera †(extinct)

References

External links

 
Insect taxonomy
Arthropod subclasses
Extant Pennsylvanian first appearances
Dicondylia